Vincent Orode Tchalla (born 7 October 1987) is a Nigerian-Togolese football striker, who plays for Akanda FC.

Career
Tchalla began his career by ASKO Kara and joined in summer 2008 to Tunisia who signed for Club Africain, he scored in his first season in the CLP-1 five goals, on 21 November 2008 turned back after visa problems. Tchalla signed for the 2009 season for Club Athlétique Bizertin a loan contract and will turned back in January 2010 to  Club Africain.

International career
Tchalla was called up on 20 November 2008 for a friendly game for the Togo national game against Rwanda national football team.

References

External links
 

1987 births
Living people
Togolese footballers
Togolese expatriate footballers
Togo international footballers
Togolese expatriate sportspeople in Tunisia
Togolese expatriate sportspeople in Gabon
Expatriate footballers in Tunisia
Expatriate footballers in the United Arab Emirates
Expatriate footballers in Gabon
ASKO Kara players
Club Africain players
CA Bizertin players
Al-Arabi SC (UAE) players
Anges FC players
Tunisian Ligue Professionnelle 1 players
UAE First Division League players
Association football forwards
21st-century Togolese people